Muirgius mac Tommaltach was King of Connacht (796–815). He was preceded by Colla mac Fergus and superseded by Mael Cothaid.

Kings of Connacht
8th-century Irish monarchs
9th-century Irish monarchs